Fighting Through is a 1919 silent American drama film, directed by Christy Cabanne. It stars E. K. Lincoln, Spottiswoode Aitken, and Millicent Fisher, and was released on January 27, 1919.

Cast list
 E. K. Lincoln as Robert Carr
 Spottiswoode Aitken as Colonel Dabney Carr
 Millicent Fisher as Maryland Warren
 Frederick Vroom as Braxton Warren
 Helen Dunbar as Mrs. Warren
 Hayward Mack as Raymond Haynes

References

External links

1919 films
American silent feature films
American black-and-white films
Silent American drama films
1919 drama films
Pathé Exchange films
Films distributed by W. W. Hodkinson Corporation
1910s American films